Puerto Fuy is a Chilean village (Spanish: aldea) in Panguipulli commune, of Los Ríos Region. Puerto Fuy lies along the 203-CH route to Huahum Pass into Argentina at western edge of Pirihueico Lake and is a terminal station of the ferry that crosses the lake connecting to Puerto Pirihueico.

Populated places in Valdivia Province
Populated lakeshore places in Chile